Siebe Blondelle (born 20 April 1986) is a Belgian professional footballer who plays for Deinze in the Belgian First Division B as a centre-back.

Career
Blondelle is a defender who made his debut in professional football, being part of the Vitesse Arnhem squad in the 2005–06 season.  For the 2008–09 season, Blondelle signed a contract with Jupiler League side FCV Dender.  In January 2010, he left FCV Dender to sign a loan deal for Rot Weiss Ahlen. After that, he signed a contract with Mons. There he played mostly in the Belgian Second Division, but also gained experience in the Jupiler Pro League. In total, he made 64 appearances, scored one goal and made five assists.

On 1 July 2012, he signed a contract with Belgian First Division A club Waasland-Beveren. There he quickly became a regular starter and played three years for the club in the highest tier. He finished his spell with 66 appearances and five goals.

On 1 July 2015, he was signed by the Belgian club Eupen. There, he was an integral part of the team which promoted back to the Belgian First Division A after one season. He was appointed captain of the team at the end of the 2018–19 season.

After his contract expired at the end of the 2019–20 season, Blondelle moved to Deinze, who had been promoted to Belgian Second Division for the 2020–21 season, and signed a three-year contract there.

International career
Blondelle is former youth international and played for the U-17, U-18, U-19 and U-20 from Belgium.

References

External links
  Voetbal International – Siebe Blondelle

1986 births
Living people
Belgian footballers
Belgium under-21 international footballers
Belgium youth international footballers
Flemish sportspeople
Footballers from Bruges
Cercle Brugge K.S.V. players
SBV Vitesse players
VVV-Venlo players
F.C.V. Dender E.H. players
Rot Weiss Ahlen players
R.A.E.C. Mons players
S.K. Beveren players
K.A.S. Eupen players
Eredivisie players
Belgian Pro League players
Challenger Pro League players
2. Bundesliga players
Expatriate footballers in the Netherlands
Belgian expatriate footballers

Association football defenders
Expatriate footballers in Germany
Belgian expatriate sportspeople in the Netherlands
Belgian expatriate sportspeople in Germany
Club Brugge KV players